The Peace Negotiation Committee was formed in 1916 to call for a truce with Germany by the future Labour MP Herbert Dunnico.

References

British Empire in World War I